Bouchra Khalili (born 1975 in Casablanca) is a Moroccan-French visual artist. 
Raised between Morocco and France, she studied Film at Sorbonne Nouvelle and Fine Arts at École nationale supérieure d'arts de Paris-Cergy.
She lives in Berlin, Germany.

Work 
Working with film, video, installation, photography, and prints, Khalili's practice articulates language, subjectivity, orality, and geographical explorations. 
"She often retools the aesthetic strategies of documentary cinema to focus on historical speculation and the representation of subjects rendered invisible by the nation-state".
Each of her projects can be seen as a platform offered to members of political minority to elaborate, narrate, and share strategies and discourses of resistance.

Her artwork focuses on personal storytelling that touches harsh politics, developing critical and ethical approaches to question citizenship, community and political agency. She meets her targeted art subjects along her journey across the Middle East, North Africa, and Europe, in sites of transit and accordingly conducts a series of meetings and preliminary conversations as she films them and collects her necessary data.

By including the subjects in her artwork it gives a more sensitive human touch, portraying real life stories and hardships, where then audiences can relate to and stand in solidarity, making the experience more intimate and personal.

In most of her work, the subjects aren't necessarily seen but they aren't voiceless either; they are articulated and decisively heard, speaking in their own tongue language, adding therefore that human touch without evading their privacy and discomfort.

Her work doesn't rely on the vulgar, bloody representation of suffering bodies, charged images, and ambient montages to create an effect, but rather on specific filming techniques and fixed frames in addition to the frame of spoken language itself.

Accordingly, with precision and subtlety, her projects challenge hegemonic narratives about migration and statelessness, as well as the violence they engender and normalize, while also pressing contemporary documentary practice forward, both ethically and aesthetically.

Exhibitions 

Khalili's work has been internationally exhibited such as at "The Mapping Journey Project" solo show at MoMA, New York (2016); "Foreign Office", solo show at Palais de Tokyo, Paris (2015); "Garden Conversation", solo show at MACBA, Barcelona (2015); "Here & Elsewhere", New Museum, New York (2014); "The Opposite of the Voice-Over", solo show at Justina M. Barnicke Gallery, Toronto (2013); "The Encyclopedic Palace", 55th Venice Biennale (2013); "Living Labour", solo show at PAMM, Miami (2013); "La Triennale", Palais de Tokyo, Paris (2012); 18th Biennale of Sydney (2012); 10th Sharjah Biennial (2011); and documenta 14 (2017) among others.

Awards 

She was the recipient of " Radcliffe Institute Fellowship", Radcliffe Institute for Advanced Study, Harvard University (2017-2018); "Abraaj Group Art Prize", (2014)"; "Sam Art Prize 2013-2015", Sam Art Projects, Paris; "DAAD Artists-in-Berlin Program" (2012); "Vera List Center for Arts and Politics Fellowship" (The New School, New York, 2011–2013); "Villa Médicis Hors-les Murs" (2010); "Videobrasil Residency Award" (2009); "Image-Mouvement Grant" (French National Centre for the Arts, 2008); "Louis Lumière Documentary Award" (Film Office, Ministry of Foreign Affairs, France, 2005).

Selected artworks 

 2018: Twenty-Two Hours. Video Installation. Single channel
 2017: The Tempest Society. Video Installation. Single channel
 2015: Foreign Office. A mixed media project composed of a digital film, a series of photographs, and a silkscreen print
 2014: Garden Conversation. Digital film. 18minutes
 2012-2013: The Speeches Series. 3 digital films
 2012: The Seaman. Digital film
 2012: The Wet Feet Series. Series of photographs
 2011: The Constellations Series. Series of 8 silkscreen prints
 2008-2011: The Mapping Journey Project. Video installation. 8 single channels

Selected Publications and Catalogues 

 2015: Bouchra KHALILI - Foreign Office. Monograph Book. Sam Art Projects Collection, 12
 2014: Here & Elsewhere. Edited by Massimiliano Gioni, Gary Carrion-Murayari, and Natalie Bell, with Negar Azimi and Kaelen Wilson-Goldie. New Museum, New York
 2014: Freedom, KunstPalais Edition, Erlangen, Germany
 2013: The Encyclopedic Palace: Guide Book, 55th Venice Biennale. Venice Biennale Foundation 
 2013: The Encyclopedic Palace: Catalogue, 55th Venice Biennale. Venice Biennale Foundation 
 2013: 5th Moscow Biennale, Catherine de Zegher, Moscow Biennale Foundation
 2013: Mirages d'Orient, Grenades et Figues de Barbarie, Ed. Actes Sud Beaux-Arts
 2012: Intense Proximity, the guidebook. Centre national des arts plastiques – Artlys
 2012: Intense Proximity, the anthology. Centre national des arts plastiques – Artlys
 2011: Mutations, perspectives on photography. Steidl/Paris Photo, 2011
 2011: Plot for a Biennial. Sharjah Art Foundation
 2010: Bouchra Khalili - Story Mapping. Monograph Book. Le Bureau des Compétences et Désirs/Presses du Réel

External links
Bouchra Khalili: The Mapping Journey Project exhibition at MoMA
BOUCHRA KHALILI
 
ADN Galeria
Afterall - Bouchra Khalili’s ‘The Speeches Series’: A Reflection from Europe
Other Maps

https://www.documenta14.de/en/artists/13565/bouchra-khalili
A rnisa Zeqo: Civic Poetry: On the Work of Bouchra Khalili, Camera Austria International 149 | 2020

References 

1975 births
Living people
Moroccan contemporary artists